The 2006 Asian Junior Women's Volleyball Championship was held in Nakhon Ratchasima, Thailand from 1 October to 9 October 2006.

Pools composition
The teams are seeded based on their final ranking at the 2004 Asian Junior Women's Volleyball Championship.

* Withdrew

Preliminary round

Pool A

|}

|}

Pool B

|}

|}

Pool C

|}

|}

Pool D

|}

|}

Second round
 The results and the points of the matches between the same teams that were already played during the preliminary round shall be taken into account for the second round.

Pool E

|}

|}

Pool F

|}

|}

Pool G

|}

|}

Pool H

|}

|}

Classification 9th–12th

Semifinals

|}

11th place

|}

9th place

|}

Final round

Quarterfinals

|}

5th–8th semifinals

|}

Semifinals

|}

7th place

|}

5th place

|}

3rd place

|}

Final

|}

Final standing

Awards
MVP:  Yan Ni
Best Scorer:  Wu Shu-fen
Best Spiker:  Chen Yao
Best Blocker:  Yan Ni
Best Server:  Fan Linlin
Best Setter:  Miho Watanabe
Best Libero:  Wang Qian

External links
 www.asianvolleyball.org

2006 in women's volleyball
V
International volleyball competitions hosted by Thailand
2006
2006 in youth sport